Joseph Ubalde or Mark Joseph H. Ubalde (8 January 1986 – 1 April 2019) was a Filipino online journalist and web trainer.

Biography 
He used to be the weather presenter for TV5's morning show, Good Morning Club, as well as Andar ng mga Balita, Aksyon News Alerts, and Balitang 60. He also headed News5 Everywhere as its content manager from 2013–2016 and was responsible for increasing its visibility online. He  won two online journalism awards for his articles on absentee mothers and overseas Filipinos.

Before working for TV5, he was a Senior News Producer for GMANewsTV and briefly worked for VERA Files under his former teachers from the University of the Philippines - Diliman.

References

1986 births
2019 deaths
Filipino journalists
People from Manila